Ho Kwan-kit (born 20 April 1997) is a Hong Kong table tennis player.

He qualified to the 2016 Summer Olympics in Rio de Janeiro, and was selected to represent Hong Kong in the men's team event.

References

1997 births
Living people
Hong Kong male table tennis players
Olympic table tennis players of Hong Kong
Table tennis players at the 2016 Summer Olympics
Table tennis players at the 2018 Asian Games
Asian Games medalists in table tennis
Asian Games bronze medalists for Hong Kong
Medalists at the 2018 Asian Games
Table tennis players at the 2020 Summer Olympics